

The JDM Roitelet (French: "Wren") was a single-seat light aircraft marketed in France by Avions JDM shortly after World War II.  However, only a single example (the prototype, registration F-WFAC) is known to have been built. It was a low-wing, open cockpit monoplane with tailskid undercarriage.

Specifications

Avions JDM
Avions JDM (from "Jean Dabos et Masclet") was a French aircraft manufacturer established in Neuilly-sur-Seine shortly after World War II to market the Roitelet for homebuilding. However, the aircraft did not sell.

References

Bibliography
 aviafrance.com
 luftfahrt-archiv.de
 aviafrance.com

1940s French sport aircraft
Homebuilt aircraft
Low-wing aircraft
Single-engined tractor aircraft
Roitelet
Aircraft first flown in 1949